Salagena arcys is a moth in the family Cossidae. It was described by David Stephen Fletcher in 1968. It is found in Tanzania and Uganda.

References

Metarbelinae
Moths described in 1968